General elections were held in British Guiana on 7 December 1964. They saw the People's Progressive Party win 24 of the 53 seats. However, the People's National Congress (22 seats) and United Force (7 seats) were able to form a coalition government with a working majority. Despite losing the elections, Prime Minister and PPP leader Cheddi Jagan refused to resign, and had to be removed by Governor Richard Luyt, with Forbes Burnham replacing him. Voter turnout was 97.0%.

Electoral system
The elections followed constitutional reforms and the re-establishment of the House of Assembly, which had been abolished in 1953, replacing the bicameral Legislature. The House had 54 members; the Speaker and 53 members elected by proportional representation. The Speaker was elected from amongst the original elected members, and then gave up their elected seat to be replaced by a member of their own party.

Results

Elected members

References

British Guiana
Elections in Guyana
General election
British Guiana
December 1964 events in South America